St. Ann's Well or St. Anne's Well may refer to:
 St. Ann's Well Gardens, Hove, a public park in Brighton and Hove, the site of a chalybeate spring
St. Ann's Well, Buxton in Derbyshire, a hot spring, and a sacred spot
 St Ann's Well railway station, former station in Nottingham.  St. Ann's Well, Nottingham is also called Robin Hood's Well. 
 St. Anne's or St. Ann's Well, Raheny (both spellings used) in Ireland
 St. Ann's Well, Malvern in  Worcestershire, a spring of Malvern water